For the military use of the facility  see Nakhon Phanom Royal Thai Navy Base
Nakhon Phanom Airport  is a small domestic airport serving Nakhon Phanom, the capital city of Nakhon Phanom Province, Thailand.  It was first constructed in 1962 by Seabees of U.S.N. Mobile Construction Battalion 3.  The project was funded by the  Military Assistance Program (MAP)

Airlines and destinations

References

External links

Nakhon Phanom Airport Homepage

Airports in Thailand
Buildings and structures in Nakhon Phanom province
Isan
Airports established in 1962